This is a list of U.S. county names that are used in two or more states. Ranked are the 429 most common county names, which are shared by counties in two or more states each, accounting for 1,732 of the 3,140 counties and county-equivalents in the United States.

List

Notes and references

External links
GEOBOPological Survey: The most popular county names, from Washington to Buffalo

Names
County names